Churi may refer to:
 Churi, Gilan
 Churi, Hormozgan